Marshall Lewis "Jit" Riddle (April 22, 1918 – September 2, 1988) was an American baseball infielder in the Negro leagues. He played from 1937 to 1943, playing mostly with the St. Louis Stars .

Career
Riddle made his Negro American League debut in 1937 for the St. Louis Stars. The following year, he began a four-year stint with the Indianapolis ABCs/St. Louis Stars/St. Louis–New Orleans Stars. Riddle was selected to the East-West All-Star Game in 1939 and 1940. His final Negro league season came in 1943 with the Cleveland Buckeyes. In 1951, he played for the Trois-Rivières Royals of the  Provincial League.

References

External links
 and Seamheads

1918 births
1988 deaths
Indianapolis ABCs players
Cleveland Buckeyes players
St. Louis Stars (1937) players
Indianapolis ABCs (1938) players
St. Louis Stars (1939) players
St. Louis–New Orleans Stars players
20th-century African-American sportspeople
Baseball infielders